Enyalioides heterolepis, Bocourt's dwarf iguana, is a species of lizards in the genus Enyalioides, from Panama, Colombia, and Ecuador.

References
 

Reptiles described in 1874
Lizards of South America
Reptiles of Colombia
Reptiles of Ecuador
Enyalioides
Taxa named by Marie Firmin Bocourt